Lasse Antero Orimus (born 12 January 1950) is a Finnish long-distance runner. He competed in the men's 5000 metres at the 1976 Summer Olympics.

References

1950 births
Living people
Athletes (track and field) at the 1976 Summer Olympics
Finnish male long-distance runners
Olympic athletes of Finland
Place of birth missing (living people)